Eric Lucassen (born 12 November 1974 in Amsterdam) is a former Dutch politician and digital music educator as well as sergeant. As a member of the Party for Freedom (Partij voor de Vrijheid) he was an MP from 17 June 2010 to 19 September 2012. He focused on matters of Kingdom relations.

References 
  Parlement.com biography

1974 births
Living people
Dutch music educators
Members of the House of Representatives (Netherlands)
Party for Freedom politicians
Politicians from Amsterdam
Royal Netherlands Army personnel
21st-century Dutch politicians